Newspaper Licensing Ireland Ltd (NLI) is an Irish not for profit company which licenses the copying and distribution of copyrighted material from print sources, such as newspapers and magazines, on behalf of the Irish print media.

History 
Seen as the print industry's equivalent of the Irish Music Rights Organisation (IMRO), the organisation responsible for licensing and collection of royalties for music within Ireland, the establishment of NLI was prompted by use of press cuttings by businesses to distribute content to employees, clients or customers.  Newspaper articles that are photocopied, scanned, passed around or published on an intranet or website may be subject to copyright, and, if so, their use must be licensed. The NLI was set up in May 2002 as a result in changes to Irish copyright law introduced by the Copyright and Related Rights Act 2000, which equips content owners with new methods to assert their copyright over their publications, as photocopying or scanning a newspaper and sending those copies to other people in a commercial environment is seen by the newspapers to be an abuse of copyright.

Membership 
The members of the NLI are companies involved in the printing industry in Ireland.  As of 2018, the organisation represents the intellectual property rights of 104 newspaper publications and 217 magazines, and 73 news websites.

Organization 
The NLI operates with 3 board members – 2 executive directors and 1 non-executive director who is appointed by the National Newspapers of Ireland, the non-profit organisation representing national daily, Sunday and weekly newspapers sold in Ireland. NLI is a member of the International Federation of Reproduction Rights Organisations (IFRRO).

Copyright and Related Rights Act 2000 
In Ireland, the Copyright & Related Rights Act (2000) states that publishers own the works contained in the published editions of their newspaper, i.e. the employers own the works of their employees (but public domain material published remains public domain).  Under this act, publishers also have the right to resell and license the copying of newspaper content.  Even though the organisation is authorised to be set up to grant licences under section 39 of the Copyright & Related Rights Act (2000), the licensing system itself is voluntary.

Claims around links to articles
At an earlier stage in the licensing regime's development, a brief but globally noted controversy developed over hyperlinks.  NLI later dropped the attempt to license such links, which are intrinsic to internet operations, and bring significant traffic to publication websites.

Submission
In 2012, the NNI (owner of NLI) made a submission to the Copyright Review Committee of the Department of Justice and Equality, which asserted that "It is the view of NNI that a link to copyright material does constitute infringement of copyright".

Threats to Women's Aid charity 
In May 2012, McGarr Solicitors stated that they had helped to draft a response to Newspaper Licensing Ireland on behalf of Women's Aid Ireland, a charity that helps victims of domestic violence, after the latter had received a cease and desist letter that sought money from the charity for linking to online newspaper articles that included positive mentions of the charity's work. In their letter, NLI alleged that the reproduction of copyrighted content without permission is theft, and that Women's Aid "will be breaking the law" if they did not comply with the NLI's demands.

The NLI's letter sought a licence fee not for actual reproduction of an article or the publication of an excerpt from an article, but merely for publishing a hyperlink to its members' articles.  The NLI's licence price-list ranges from €300 for 1–5 links published annually, to €1,250 for 26–50 links published annually.  The price for publishing more than 50 links is "negotiable".

The reply to NLI points out that the terms and conditions of the NLI's member newspaper websites in many cases explicitly grant permission to produce weblinks to articles and that some NLI member websites include up to 300 sharing buttons that permit and encourage easy creation of weblinks for use on social media.

Reaction
In December 2012, McGarr Solicitors issued a follow-up press release to the original. Following a tweet of this link by Graham Linehan, this went viral and was covered internationally by both traditional print and new media, including Boing Boing, The New York Observer, The Guardian, and Forbes, and was also addressed by Professors of Journalism Jay Rosen, Jeff Jarvis and George Brock.  An opinion piece published by McGarr on Irish news website, The Journal.ie, draws attention to the fact that in contrast to the international coverage, the story and the issue itself has still not been covered by any Irish print media.

References

External links 
Home Page of Newspaper Licensing Ireland
 Copyright & Related Rights Act (2000)
Profile on IFFRO site

Mass media in Ireland